The 1992–93 season was the 95th season of competitive football played by Arsenal.

Season summary
Fans favourite David Rocastle had been sold to Leeds for £2 million, however George Graham had signed one of Denmark's European championship-winning heroes John Jensen, from Bröndby for £1.1 million. In February 1993 Graham paid Everton £2 million to re-sign Martin Keown, the England centre back who had left Highbury for Aston Villa shortly after Graham's arrival in 1986. Though he was cup-tied and couldn't play in the cup games.

Arsenal went from being a title-chasing team to a formidable cup-team, and with a more pragmatic, game-by-game approach, finished the 1992/93 season with both domestic cups. A disappointing league season, in which Arsenal finished tenth and didn’t even manage to average a goal a game , and played some truly dire football, especially at home, had ended in historic glory. As well as two pieces of silverware, the resulting European qualification would prove just as important, ensuring Arsenal qualified for the European Cup Winners Cup, and were thereby positioned for yet more success.

The end of the season saw the departure of long-serving Irish defender David O'Leary, who, to date, holds the record for the most appearances, 722, for Arsenal.

Arsenal Stadium looked like a building site throughout the season. The stadium had to be rebuilt to comply with the Taylor Reports recommendations. The symbol of Highbury's rebuilding was a mural that covered the old North Bank end. The North Bank terrace had been demolished to make way for a new all-seat stand, and the mural was created to hide the construction site. But in front of the mural, they took all three points only eight times and lost seven of their 21 home games. The mural received criticism and became a vehicle for political point-scoring when it came to light that none of its faces was black, an oversight quickly rectified. With ground capacity temporarily reduced to 29.000, home games were virtually sold out every week.

Premier League

Arsenal hosted Norwich City at Highbury on the opening weekend of the season.

Arsenal recorded  their first league win of the campaign against Liverpool at Anfield; midfielder Ray Parlour created both of the team's goals. This was followed by a 2–0 win at home to Oldham Athletic, where the attendance of 20,796 was Highbury's lowest in over four years, as Highbury's capacity was restricted while the North Bank was being rebuilt.

September was a disappointing month for the Gunners, who won just one out of five league games. But their 1–0 home win over Manchester City on 28 September signaled the start of a six-match winning run which propelled them to the top of the table on 7 November. However, they gained just three points from their next eight games, which included a four-match run of defeats and didn't include a single win, which left Arsenal's title hopes looking dead by the turn of 1993. However, they were still in the Football League Cup, and now had the FA Cup to play for.

Matches

Classification

Results summary

Results by round

Football League Cup

The Football League Cup is a cup competition open to clubs in the Premier League and Football League. Like the FA Cup it is played on a knockout basis, with the exception of the second round and semi-finals, which are contested over a two-legged tie.

Arsenal entered the competition in the second round, as one of the 22 teams from the Premier League. They were drawn against Millwall; the first leg took place at Highbury on 22 September 1992. In the match Campbell scored in the 78th minute to cancel out Millwall's lead early in the second half. The second leg at The Den was much the same, with both teams playing out for a 1–1 draw. As there were no further goals the match was decided by a penalty shoot-out, which Arsenal won 3–1.

Next up were Derby. Arsenal started with Pål Lydersen and Steve Morrow in place of the injured Lee Dixon and Nigel Winterburn. Derbys Paul Simpson converted a 70th minute penalty and Kevin Campbell came to the rescue once more, collecting Anders Limpars pass to force a replay, five weeks later. Campbell and Ian Wright wrapped that game up early, despite Mark Pembridges 44th minute penalty. 

At the postponed fourth round tie at Scarborough the conditions were far from ideal because of wintry weather the pitch was soaked. Fog enveloped the ground throughout the first half, but Arsenal kept their nerve and Winterburn drilled the only goal. 

That brought Nottingham Forest to Highbury. The Gunners upped the tempo after a stuttering first half. Wrights pace terrified the Forest defence and he claimed both goals. 

Wright hit the opener, from the penalty spot, in the semi-final first leg against his old club, Crystal Palace. Alan Smith lashed the second after Nigel Martyn had blocked Wright. Simon Osborn replied from the spot in the second half, but Smith prodded home Arsenals third to make the second leg at Highbury a formality. Andy Linighans early header and Wrights goal made it 5-1 on aggregate. 

Without the injured Smith, the suspended Dixon and the cup-tied Keown Arsenal were forced to shuffle their pack. Paul Davis was recalled, to unanimous amazement, after just one comeback match in the reserves following hamstring trouble. And Northern Ireland defender Morrow was pressed into service beside Davis in midfield, where he was to command centre stage. April 18, 1993 will be remembered as Steve Morrows final.

The Owls snatched an early lead through American John Harkes. Paul Merson inspired Arsenals comeback with a stunning 25-yarder that left Chris Woods stranded. Morrows magic moment arrived midway through the second half. Carlton Palmer miscued his clearence and in raced the Northern Ireland international, pouncing to crash his first goal for the Gunners. Then to the drama after the final whistle. Morrow was celebrating with Adams, when he tumbled to the turf. Suddenly the players around him realised this was serious. Morrow was wheeled away on a stretcher, an oxygen mask strapped to his face. He was diagnosed as having a broken arm and the operation was performed that night. The injury kept Morrow out for the rest of the season, and took the shine off the Gunners celebrations. Tony Adams, understandably, was too upset to speak to the press.

FA Cup
When Arsenal won the double in 1971, they began their FA Cup procession at Yeovil. Now TV and press gathered, sensing an upset to make national headlines. "Sorry to disappoint you, lads", grinned George Graham after Ian Wrights hattrick had demolished the non-league Yeovil Town on their own patch at The Huish Park.

The fourth round matched Arsenal with Leeds in a re-run of the marathon 1991 tie. Leeds led 2-0 at half time. The Gunners came out blazing in the second half. Ray Parlour quickly pulled one back. Then, with nine minutes left, Paul Merson unleashed a 25-yarder that flashed past keeper John Lukic. So to a replay at Elland Road. Injury-hit Arsenal arrived with youngsters Ian Selley, Steve Morrow and Parlour in midfield. David Seaman made a breathtaking early save from Lee Chapman. Yet the longer the game went on, the more comfortable the battling Gunners seemed.  Leeds were stunned when Ian Wright crossed from the left and Alan Smith hooked Arsenal in front. Carl Shutt and Gary McAllister made it 2-1 for Leeds. Up popped Wright again with the minutes ticking away. Extra time and Wright cracked the third.

Two more Wright corkers, both from Ian Selley assists, saw off Nottingham Forest in the fifth round.

On to Ipswich for the quarter final. Tony Adams hadn’t scored since March 1992. The Arsenal skipper playing with a dressing on his forehead, headed home Mersons free-kick to equalise Chris Kiwomyas opener. John Wark floored Wright in the box, and Ian Wright stroked away the penalty. Then Phil Whelan, under pressure from Wright, nicked a back pass past Clive Baker. Boncho Genchev made it 3-2 when Arsenal failed to clear a free-kick. But sub Kevin Campbell cracked a fourth in the dying minutes.

A crowd of 76,263 packed Wembley on 4 April 1993 for the semi final, and sweet revenge for Arsenal after Tottenham had denied them a double in 1991. Tottenham claimed a penalty when Andy Linighan challanged Darren Anderton outside the box. David Seaman was immaculate as Spurs stepped up the pressure. Erik Thorstvedt made great saves from Selley and Wright. But with 13 minutes left Adams turned the tie. Merson swung over a free-kick and Adams arrived on the far post to head the winner, leading to another Wembley clash with Sheffield Wednesday.

Two weary teams produced a tired FA Cup final. After 18 minutes, Wednesdays Mark Bright brought down Lee Dixon, Paul Davis floated the free-kick, Linighan nodded it across goal and Ian Wright stooped to nod Arsenal ahead. He played with a broken toe but maintained his remarkable goalscoring record for the season. A John Sheridan cross was nodded back by Bright, and John Harkes stooped at the far post to touch the ball into David Hirsts path. Even extra time couldn't produce a winner. It also turned out to be the very last time the FA Cup Final required a replay.

The FA Cup final replay, played on the following Thursday in torrential rain, attracted only 62.367 spectators, the lowest crowd ever for the fixture at Wembley, and the lowest FA Cup final attendance for 71 years. Arsenal dominated  the first 65 minutes of a bruising confrontation. Alan Smith sent Wright racing through to beat Chris Woods after 34 minutes. It was the Wrights 56th goal in 79 matches for Arsenal. Smith flicked another effort into the side netting and Wednesday hadn’t troubled David Seaman. That all changed after 68 minutes. Chris Waddles shot deflected off Lee Dixon and Seaman was beaten. Wednesday were on a high. They could have won it a few minutes later. Extra time again and tired legs tried to conjure a winner. Penalties looked inevitable. Then Andy Linighan struck in the last minute when he met Paul Merson’s corner with a header, which Woods got two hands to, but couldn’t keep out. Also Linighan did it with a broken nose inflicted by an Elbow from Mark Bright, as well as two broken fingers. Just 18 months earlier, he had asked for a transfer because he could not gain regular first team football at Highbury. Now he will be remembered as the man who scored the latest FA Cup goal of all time.

Squad statistics
Arsenal used a total of 29 players during the 1992–93 season and there were nine different goalscorers. There were also two squad members who did not make a first-team appearance in the campaign. Adams featured in 52 games and started the most games in the squad. The team scored a total of 72 goals in all competitions. The top goalscorer was Wright, with 30 goals – half of which were scored in the league.

Key

No. = Squad number

Pos = Playing position

Nat. = Nationality

Apps = Appearances

GK = Goalkeeper

DF = Defender

MF = Midfielder

FW = Forward

Numbers in parentheses denote appearances as substitute. Players with name struck through and marked  left the club during the playing season.

Source:

See also

 1992–93 in English football

References
General

Specific

Arsenal F.C. seasons
Arsenal